Žejane is a village in the eastern part of mountainous Ćićarija area in Istria, Croatia. Administratively it belongs to the municipality of Matulji in Primorje-Gorski Kotar County. In 2011, the population of Žejane was 130.

Description
The village is situated 18 km north-west of Matulji, near the municipality road which leads from Vele Mune and Male Mune to Opatija and Rijeka, in karst valley between two mountain ridges.

The village is known for the Ćići: Istro-Romanians who settled here in the late 15th, or early 16th century from 1510 until 1525, when the villages Vele Mune, Male Mune, and Žejane were settled by Krsto Frankopan.

Demography

Citations

Bibliography

External links 

Istro-Romanian settlements
Populated places in Primorje-Gorski Kotar County